Indrajith may refer to:
 Indrajith Sukumaran, Indian film actor and singer
 Indrajit, the son of the Lankan king Ravana
 Indrajith (1989 film), a 1989 Kannada film
 Indrajith (2007 film), a 2007 Indian Malayalam film
 Indrajith (2017 film), a 2017 Tamil action-adventure film